Utricularia corynephora is a small, probably perennial, carnivorous plant that belongs to the genus Utricularia. Its native distribution includes Burma and Thailand and is only known from the type specimen from the southern peninsula of Burma and from a collection on the adjacent peninsula in Thailand. It was originally described by Peter Taylor in 1986.

See also 
 List of Utricularia species

References 

Carnivorous plants of Asia
Flora of Myanmar
Flora of Thailand
Plants described in 1986
corynephora